Stetsonia is the scientific name of two genera of organisms and may refer to:

Stetsonia (foraminifera), a genus of foraminifera in the family Pseudoparrellidae
Stetsonia (plant), a genus of plants in the cactus family